Hawk Owl  could refer to:

 The northern hawk-owl (Surnia ulula)
 Any of the species of owl in the Australo-Asiatic genus Ninox
 The main character of Ultimate Adventures

Animal common name disambiguation pages